The Jakobselva or Grense Jakobselv (Vor'yema) is a river that runs along the Russia-Norway border. The river runs along the border of Sør-Varanger Municipality in Troms og Finnmark county, Norway, and Pechengsky District in Murmansk Oblast, Russia. The river discharges into the Varangerfjorden, a bay off the Barents Sea.

This river is known as a superb salmon fishing river, but where the river forms the border only Norwegian citizens and long-term residents of Norway are permitted to fish, and then only on the Norwegian side of the river (fishing license needed). The Russian side is normally not accessible, something which is a general rule for all the Russian border to Norway and Finland.

The Jakobselva lends its name to the small village of Grense Jakobselv, near the mouth of the river in Norway.

References

Sør-Varanger
Rivers of Troms og Finnmark
Norway–Russia border
Rivers of Murmansk Oblast
Drainage basins of the Barents Sea
International rivers of Europe
Rivers of Norway